Karel Vohralík (February 22, 1945 in Pardubice, Bohemia and Moravia – October 17, 1998 in Pardubice, Czech Republic) was an ice hockey player who played for the Czechoslovak national team. He won a bronze medal at the 1972 Winter Olympics.

References

External links

1945 births
1998 deaths
Czech ice hockey defencemen
HC Dynamo Pardubice players
Ice hockey players at the 1972 Winter Olympics
Medalists at the 1972 Winter Olympics
Olympic bronze medalists for Czechoslovakia
Olympic ice hockey players of Czechoslovakia
Olympic medalists in ice hockey
Sportspeople from Pardubice
Czechoslovak ice hockey defencemen